Jiazi may refer to:

Sexagenary cycle, cycle of sixty terms used for recording days or years
Jiazi, Lufeng, Guangdong, town in China
Jiazi, Haikou, town in Hainan, China